This is the list of songs performed by the French singer Mireille Mathieu.

French

German

Italian

(Most Italian-language Mireille songs are conducted by Paul Mauriat, some are conducted by Ennio Morricone with whom she recorded the album "Mireille Mathieu chante Ennio Morricone" in 1974.

Spanish

Catalan

Songs in various languages 

This list contains songs who are sung in at least two languages.
The year shows in which a song was first published.

References

Mathieu